Grace P. Johnson Stadium at Lumbee Guaranty Bank Field is a 4,000-seat college football stadium located in Pembroke, North Carolina. The stadium, located inside the Irwin Belk Athletic Complex, is the home field of the UNC Pembroke Braves. The Braves compete as a National Collegiate Athletic Association (NCAA) Division II Independent.

References

External links
UNC Pembroke Braves - Athletics website

Athletics (track and field) venues in North Carolina
Buildings and structures in Robeson County, North Carolina
College football venues
Sports venues in North Carolina
UNC Pembroke Braves football
American football venues in North Carolina